The Central Hessian dialect is a German dialect subgroup of the Hessian branch of Central German. It has only partly undergone the High German (HG) consonant shift but has had a different vowel development than most other German dialects.

Location 
The dialect is spoken around the center of the German state of Hesse.

Phonetics and development from Middle High German 

The dialect sounds softer than HG and often „glues“ words together. It also is hard to understand for non-natives, fellow Germans as well.

Vowels 

Diphthongs: aɪ̯ aʊ̯ ɛɪ̯ ɔʊ̯ ɔɪ̯

Orthography: î, i, û, u, ê, é, e, ô, o, á, â, a, ai, au, ei, ou, oi

Consonants 

The „R“ can be realised as a bunch of different phonemes, some dialects use the uvular trill, some the velar, some the alveolar, some do the english r and others just tap.

Orthography: p, v, t, k, b, w, d, g, m, n, l, ng, s, z, tj/dj, sj, h, + r

Cluster-Onsets: pr, pl, vr, vl, tr, kr, kl, [ʃ…] sr, sl, sm, sn, st, sp

Development 
Central Hessian did partake only partially in HG consonant shift and later further underwent a general gradation process for almost all consonants.

HG consonant shift (partially) 
T

t_ > ts_

_tt_ > _ss_

_t_ > _ts_

_t > _s

K

k_ X

_kk_ X

_k_ > _h_ [x~ç]

_k > _h [x~ç]

P

p_ X

_pp_ X

_p_ > _f_

_p > _f

D

d_ X

_d_ > _t_

“Hessian“ consonant gradation 
Between vowels

-all voiceless consonants are voiced 

-voiced consonants become (voiced) fricatives, /d/ shifts to [ɾ] 

In general 

-/h/ from /k/ develops a vowel to consonant harmony; becomes [ʃ~ʒ] after front vowels and [x~ɣ] after back vowels 

-/g/ also develops this harmony but tends to elide after front vowels, only to merge with /h/ after back vowels

Development from MHG onwards

Diphthongisation 
Like in modern HG long î and û underwent diphthongisation.

î > ai 

like in „t͡sa͜ɪt“ MHG zît - time, and

û > au

like in „bɾa͜ʊɣə“ MHG brûchen- to need

MHG diphthongs 
Unlike HG the old diphthongs did not merge with  diphthongizing long vowels but merged together instead:

ei, eu, ou > â

some other diphthongs switched within

ie > ei

uo > ou (with some exceptions becoming u)

iu > oi (more consistent than HG)

Vowel heightening 
In contrast to HG long ô, â and ê did not remain unchanged, they shifted to the now vacant position of the long high vowels.

ê > î

ô > û

Since long ô was now also vacant, â also shifted.

â > ô

Endings 
All MHG inflectional endings were shortened.

-ən > -ə [en]

-ə > -◌ [e]

Other changes 
It has to be mentioned tho, that this is only the basic development and every dialect may have some small changes. Short open i in some dialects shifted to [ɛ], short u to [ɔ]. Old long i in some dialects behaves differently and became oi in word final position or was simply shortened: „enoi“/„enin“ - „hinein“

The development of vowels before „r“ is especially tricky, because younger generations tend to not pronounce it in coda position. It may follow the same patterns as if there would be no „r“, shifting further towards the evolving vowel realisation; „dorh“ [dɔrʃ~dɔʃ] (through) or even further away from it; „irst“ [irʃt~iɐʃt] (first).

Grammar 
The dialect basically features the same grammar as High German. Verbs inflect for person, number and tense and periphrastically for mood and aspect. Pronouns to a higher degree than nouns inflect for case and number.

There are four cases and two numbers.

Pronouns 
"Before a consonant/before a vowel", this also depends on the dialect. Pronouns like in Dutch and Italian have a strong and a weak form ( > ), whether or not they are focused on and where they locate in the sentence; the weak forms glue to their surroundings and are often used for the direct object. All in all, the weak forms are steadily replacing the strong forms with each generation:

“mahhemir“ > „mahheme“ > „mâme“ > „mamme“ = We make (in VS word order)

HG "Duzen".

The 2nd polite triggers 3rd pl forms on the verb. HG "Siezen".

Verbs 
Suffix chart:

Present 
Verb in the present often show a simple ablaut system, where the plural forms take the stem vowel, whilst the singular may trigger a mutation. In some dialects or as a consequence of hypercorrections this ablaut spreads to new forms.

The mutation can also involve the consonant; in the following examples from /h/ [x~ɣ] to /h/ [ʃ] and from /g/ [x~ɣ] to /ɡ/ [ç~ʝ] or [◌].

The verb "to be" is irregular

Past 
Although there is an equivalent to the German "Imperfekt", it is much more preferred to use the perephrastical "Haben/Sein-Perfekt". It is constructed by using the forms of "to have" (or "To be", if the verb describes an action of moving around and is unchangeably intransitive) in the present tense in combination with the past-participle form which is often highly irregular, but in theory should stick to the blueprint "geSTEMt".

As one of the most used verbs, „to have“ is not only highly irregular but also easily adopted from other dialects or HG, which means, that this table is only one of many possibilities.

Examples of the past participle:

come - gekumme

said - gesâ(g)t

seen - gesî

been - gewêse

done - gedô

made - gemaht

Conjunctive 
The Present Conjunctive is produced by using the present conjunctive forms of the verb "to do" in combination with the infinitive (identical to the 3rd person plural).

The Past Conjunctive is produced by using the present conjunctive forms of the verbs "to have" and "to be" in combination with the past participle. The same distinction is made as in the past.

Passive 
The Passive mood is formed by using the verb "to get" in the particular tense.

Contrary to HG and English, tho, no special case switch is necessary to denote the roles anew.

English: I say it. It is said to me.

HG: Ich sage es. Es wird mir gesagt.

Central Hessian: Aih sâg‿es. Aih krei‿es gesât.

Present: ToGet + infinitive

Present Conjunctive: WouldDo + participle + "kreie"

Past: ToHave/ToBe + participle + "gekreit"

Past Conjunctive: WouldHave/WouldBe + participle + "gekreit"

Nouns 
Nouns seldom inflect for case anymore. This is instead done by the definite and indefinite articles, which also can help to differentiate gender (m, f, n). Like pronouns, articles have a strong and a weak form, the strong serves as demonstrative pronoun or number respectfully whilst the weak is purely grammatical.

Plurality is marked via the suffix -e (dâg, dâge = day, days), rarely -er (haus, hoiser) or Umlaut alone (kau, koi = cow, cows).

Central Hessian employs diminutives more often than Standard German: wuz = pig, but wuzzî (little pig is used instead). The suffixes are -sje (HG -chen), the rare -l(a(i)) (HG -lein) and -î (no equivalent), both former ones may trigger Umlaut (baub, baube, boibsje = boy, boys, little boy). Diminutives indicate no number on their ending alone. The difference between -sje and -î is that -sje is used after single plosives preferredly whilst -î is used after consonant clusters and sibilants (kaz, kézzî = cat, kitten; haus, hoisî = house, small house).

Comparison with New High German 
Here two Examples of the dialect; the differences between the dialects of the villages of Ostheim and Heldenbergen in the city of Nidderau, only two kilometres away from each other.

Ostheim (Uustim): "Wû witten da klîhâ hî hû?" HG: "Wo willst du dein Kleeheu hin haben?" - Where do you want to have your clover hay put?

Heldenbergen (Helbische): "Wû wisten da hâ hî hû?" HG: "Wo willst du dein Heu hin haben?" - Where do you want to have your hay put?

The dialect has a large corpus of inherent dialectal Westgermanic vocabulary, latin and french borrows, and imports from other dialects after the Flight and expulsion of Germans (1944–1950) from other territories.

But it does not have to use different words to be quite incomprehensible, because shared lexemes are hard to recognise as a result of several vowel shifts.

References 

German dialects